Mismatched is a 2020 Indian Hindi-language coming-of-age romantic drama web series on Netflix, based on Sandhya Menon's 2017 novel When Dimple Met Rishi. It was adapted by Gazal Dhaliwal and directed by Akarsh Khurana and Nipun Dharmadhikari. It is produced by Ronnie Screwvala's RSVP Movies. Starring Prajakta Koli, Rohit Saraf, Rannvijay Singha and Vidya Malvade in prominent roles, the series is about Rishi, a die-hard romantic who believes in traditional ways of dating, who falls for Dimple, a gamer, and eventually wants to marry her.

Dhaliwal adapted the novel in early 2018, with the script being tweaked for the series. While the novel is set in the United States, the story was adapted to take place in Jaipur. The series features cinematography handled by Avinash Arun and Milind Jog, with editing done by Sanyukta Kaza and Namrata Rao. Mismatched features a soundtrack album composed by Jasleen Royal, Samar Grewal, Anurag Saikia, Prateek Kuhad, Shashwat Singh, Taaruk Raina, Deepa Unnikrishnan, Abhijay Negi and Hiphop Bhaiya, with Saikia also composing background score for the series.

The series premiered on 20 November 2020, through the streaming platform Netflix. It received a positive response from audiences, with critics praising the chemistry of Saraf and Koli, the performances of the cast, music and background score. However, the writing and the direction was criticized.

The series was renewed for a second season on 3 March 2021. Season 2 premiered on Netflix on 14th October 2022.

Plot 
Mismatched is a rom-com based on Sandhya Menon's best selling book ‘When Dimple Met Rishi’. Dimple Ahuja (Prajakta Koli) wants to be a tech wizard and Rishi Singh Shekhawat (Rohit Saraf) is a young guy who believes in traditional way of dating: meeting in person, being drunk on love, and has come to Aravalli Institute to find his ‘Future Wife’. Dimple is driven and Rishi's bewitched, and wants to tie the knot with her.

Cast 
 Prajakta Koli as Dimple Ahuja; Simple and Dheeraj's daughter; Celina's best friend; Rishi's love interest; Harsh's project partner and former love interest
 Rohit Saraf as Rishi Singh Shekhawat; Kalpana's son; Namrata's best friend; Sanskriti's former love interest; Dimple's love interest
 Vihaan Samat as Harsh Agarwal, Dimple's project partner and former love interest
 Rannvijay Singha as Professor Siddharth Sinha (Sid Sir); Zeenat's love interest.
 Vidya Malvade as Zeenat Karim, Sid's love interest.
 Sanjana Sarathy as Sanskriti, Rishi's former love interest
 Devyani Shorey as Namrata Bidasaria, Rishi's best friend
 Priya Banerjee as Ayesha Duggirala, Namrata's love interest
 Taaruk Raina as Anmol Malhotra, Dimple's rival
 Muskkaan Jaferi as Celina Matthews, Dimple's bestfriend and Namrata's former love interest
 Kritika Bharadwaj as Simran Malhotra, Anmol's cousin and Krish's girlfriend
 Abhinav Sharma as Krish Katyal, Anmol's best friend and Simran's boyfriend
 Ruturaj Shinde as Momo
 Lisha Bajaj as Hostel Warden
 Akarsh Khurana as Anmol's therapist
 Ahsaas Channa as Vinny, Anmol's new friend
 Dipannita Sharma as Nandini Nahata, Sid's ex-wife and Dimple's career idol
 Ravin Makhija as Ashish Singh Shekhawat, Rishi's brother
 Suhasini Mulay as Rishi's Grandmother
 Aditi Govitrikar as Kalpana, Rishi's mother; Randeep's wife
 Jugal Hansraj as Rishi's father
 Kshitee Jog as Simple Ahuja, Dimple's mother
 Jatin Sial as Dheeraj Ahuja, Dimple's father
 Adhir Bhat as Mr. Bidasaria, Namrata's father
 Sarika Singh as Mrs. Bidasaria, Namrata's mother
 Digvijay Savant as Randeep, Rishi's stepfather
 Shaunak Ramesh as Ramaswamy
 Trishna Singh as Shahana
 Vaibhav Palhade as Samar
 Yash Buddhdev as Danish Tamang
 Chirag Pardesi as Ritik

Episodes

Season 1 (2020)

Season 2 (2022)

Production

Development 
In late 2018, Netflix India and Ronnie Screwvala of RSVP Movies approached screenwriter Gazal Dhaliwal to adapt Sandhya Menon's 2017 novel When Dimple Met Rishi for Indian audiences. The original novel is about two Indo-American teenagers, Dimple and Rishi (the titular characters), whose parents are trying to arrange their marriage. Published by Hachette Book Group, it opened to good response from readers, and became a best selling novel, according to a report from New York Times. Netflix picked Akarsh Khurana (of Karwaan fame) and Nipun Avinash Dharmadhikari to direct the series.

Dhaliwal had already finished writing the script before Khurana was roped in to helm the series. Khurana approved of the new script as - 'it was a love-story between two real people with real issues'. He added, "Even though this was essentially a young adult romance, there was maturity in the way it was depicted. Dhaliwal, who counts Kuch Kuch Hota Hai as one of her guilty pleasures, was similarly drawn in by the simplicity of the high-school romance at the heart of the book, a contrast to the large-scale candyfloss high school universe depicted in Hindi films."

Casting 
In a Firstpost interview, Dhaliawal stated about the casting and characters, syncing to the adaptation and the liberties while recalibrating the story to the Indian context. She added, "The story is about a setup which has gone horribly wrong. To make that happen, it was important to change the family dynamics. Akarsh and I felt very strongly about the fact that it wouldn't have been believable for Indian viewers if Rishi's parents were behind him to start looking out for girls when he's all of 18 so that he can get married in two years. So I introduced a grandmother in the mix (her character is not featured in the book), effectively using the older generation's adherence to tradition as justification for the arranged marriage setup. I also played around with Rishi's dynamics with his parents as well: In the book, Rishi's parents, who belong to a typical Gujarati family, are still together and Rishi is built to be more obedient than hopeless romantic."

Characters 
Prajakta Koli and Rohit Saraf were cast in the series, marking the debut for the former. In an interview, Saraf stated, "The biggest selling point for him about the show was the 'romance' it has. The love, ambition, navigating through the college years of one's life and a kind of acceptance toward all that I going on in the life was something I found very relatable." Koli described her character Dimple, "She's very driven to achieve her goal; if she doesn't, her parents will get her married! Isn't that relatable to so many girls —and boys — across the country? I have so many cousins in my family who are dealing with this dilemma. That's why Dimple is so tough to crack; she doesn't let her guard down at all." Rannvijay Singha stated his character as being "cool and snarky on the outside but a softie inside, Professor Sid (himself) believes in tough love when it comes to his students". Speaking about his role, he further added that his character wants to push students out of their comfort zones so that they can each reach their highest potential.

Filming 
While the book is set in the United States, the story was adapted to take place in Jaipur. About the setting, Khurana stated in an interview to Poulomi Das of Firstpost, that "When I initially read Gazal's take on the book, what I loved was that she altered the context for the love story at the centre of the proceedings and introduced a host of new characters who had very distinct characteristics which made the world building so much more interesting."

Shooting of the series took place in November 2019, with some portions being filmed Old Royal School of Jodhpur, and majority of the scenes were filmed in Jaipur. The shooting took place for 38–39 days, with the cast members shooting for 12 hours daily. The post-production was completed in May 2020 amid the COVID-19 pandemic lockdown in India.

Soundtrack 

The soundtrack album for Mismatched was composed by an assortment of nine artists, which includes Jasleen Royal, Samar Grewal, Anurag Saikia, Prateek Kuhad, Shashwat Singh, Taaruk Raina, Deepa Unnikrishnan, Abhijay Negi and Hiphop Bhaiya. Five of them also wrote lyrics for the songs, along with Nikhita Gandhi, Raj Shekhar, Shwetang Shankar, Ritviz. Anurag Saikia also scored the background music for the series. The soundtrack album, which released on 11 November 2020, features seven tracks upon the initial release, with an eighth song "Sun Toh" unveiled on 20 November as a bonus track.

Reviewing the soundtrack, Devarsi Ghosh of Scroll.in stated, "The Mismatched soundtrack is a couple of soft ballads along with some wacky cross-genre stuff, that doesn't make you disappoint." Umesh Punwani of Koimoi stated, "The album consists of fresh, peppy songs that accompany each unique character in this series through their individual journeys. From high energy to heartwarming and even melancholic, this album is perfect for a young, experimental, music-loving audience."

Release 
On 16 July 2020, Netflix announced the release of seventeen Indian originals, with Mismatched being one of them, scheduled for a release in late 2020. On 3 November 2020, the makers unveiled the first look posters through social media platforms and the official trailer was released on 6 November 2020. Ahead of its release, the makers conducted a virtual college fest event, through YouTube, in order to promote the series. The series premiered on Netflix on 20 November 2020.

Reception 
Poulomi Das of Firstpost stated, "There is a certain convenience to the storytelling... that makes teenage adolescence look like a statement, and not a stage of life." Antara Kashyap of News18 gave two-and-a-half out of five to the series and stated, "Mismatched is a show which should be watched for what it is, a light teenage drama to be binged on a weekend. There isn't a lot of depth in it, but it really isn't fair to expect it from the show in the first place." Raja Sen of Mint reviewed "There is a fair bit that doesn't — the final episode, evidently existing only to create emotionally high-strung cliff-hangers for the next season, is a massive letdown — but, on the whole, Mismatched has heart." Avinash Ramachandran of The New Indian Express stated, "Despite the missed opportunities and pulled-back punches, Mismatched does have its moments under the Jaipur sun."

Pallabi Dey Purkayastha of The Times of India, gave three out of five and stated, "The fresh pairing of Rohit Saraf and Prajakta Koli is a delight to watch on screen – the duo shares a crackling chemistry and sort of heightens the drama surrounding teenage bickering in an adorable way." Shubham Kulkarni of Koimoi gave the series, a rating of 3 out of 5 and stated, "If you decide to watch this, wear your nostalgia glasses. Also be ready to be impressed by the majority of the cast including Prajakta Koli, Rohit Saraf and the hidden gems Muskkaan Jaferi and Vidya Malvade. If you have nothing to relax with this weekend, go for Mismatched, but with no expectations." Sanjana Jadhav of Pinkvilla stated, "Mismatched on Netflix creates a young, fun and drama-filled world of college students but with prospects of marriage looming that seems to be the biggest dampener."

References

External links
 

Television shows based on Indian novels
Television shows set in Jaipur
Hindi-language web series
Indian drama web series
Indian comedy web series
Hindi-language Netflix original programming